Homeland is a supermarket chain in the United States. Homeland is the main supermarket banner of Homeland Acquisition Corporation (H.A.C., Inc.), the supermarket banner's parent company, and the names are often used interchangeably.  Homeland's headquarters is in Oklahoma City, Oklahoma.  As of 2019, it operates 79 supermarkets in Oklahoma, Kansas, Georgia and Texas. Many of H.A.C., Inc.'s supermarkets also include pharmacies and fuel centers. In 2019, Homeland purchased the remaining Oklahoma Food Pyramid stores from Rogersville, Missouri based Pyramid Foods which owns Price Cutter and Ramey.

History

Origins 
The company traces its history to the first United Supermarket opened in Sayre, Oklahoma by H.D. Snell in 1916.  United Supermarkets of Oklahoma became part of Homeland in 2008.

Homeland Stores Inc. 
Homeland used to be the Oklahoma division of Safeway, and it was spun off from Safeway in 1987. The "Homeland" name was adopted in 1988.  Homeland Stores Inc. operated as an independent chain and, at times, a publicly traded company until 2002.

Subsidiary of A.W.G. 
Homeland filed for Chapter 11 bankruptcy in September 2002, at which point it was bought by and became a subsidiary of Associated Wholesale Grocers. The supermarkets still operate under the "Homeland" name.

In 2004 the company acquired three Country Mart supermarkets in Lawton, Oklahoma.  In 2005 the company purchased seven stores in Wichita, Kansas from Falley's.  In 2006 the company purchased the remaining fifteen stores from Falley's.  In June 2007, Homeland purchased seven stores from the Albertsons grocery chain. In January 2008, Homeland purchased the 26-store United Supermarkets of Oklahoma chain.  On November 14, 2008, Homeland purchased five Williams Discount Food stores, formerly Albertsons.  This purchase became official December 14, 2008.  In August 2011, Homeland purchased the three-store Super Save Food chain.

Employee Owned Company 
Homeland was sold to its employees in December 2011.

In 2015, the company converted three stores to the Cash Saver format. In this format, the retail price reflects the cost of the product and 10% is added on at the register.

In September 2013, Homeland's parent company, HAC, Inc. expanded into Georgia by buying 11 of the Belle Foods chain stores; most of those stores bearing the Piggly Wiggly name. The company acquired three additional Georgia locations the following year.

In 2015 the company acquired a location in El Reno, Oklahoma, which was previously operated by Prague Grocery. This location was eventually rebannered as a United Supermarket. The company also converted an additional six locations to the Cash Saver format.

In 2017, the company became a founding member of the Certified EO organization which aims to promote employee ownership. In December 2018, H.A.C., Inc. was honored by The Shelby Report as the South Eastern Retailer of the Year.

In 2019, the company acquired five stores from RPCS INC 3 in Ponca City, 1 in Bartlesville, and 1 in Stillwater.[11]

Retail Banners 
As of 2021, H.A.C., Inc. operated the following banners:

 Homeland (36 locations)
 United (17 locations)
 Cash Saver (17 locations)
 Piggly Wiggly (4 locations)
 Food World (4 locations)
 Ponca City Discount Foods ( 1 Location)

Locations
 Dawson, GA (Piggly Wiggly)
 East Dublin, GA (Food World)
 Eastman, GA (Cash Saver)
 Gordon, GA (Piggly Wiggly)
 Macon, GA (Piggly Wiggly)
 Milledgeville, GA (Piggly Wiggly)
 Statesboro, GA (Food World)
 Vidalia, GA (Food World)
 Haysville, KS (Cash Saver)
 Altus, OK (United)
 Ardmore, OK (Homeland)
 Bartlesville, OK (Homeland and United)
 Bethany, OK (Cash Saver)
 Blackwell, OK (United)
 Cherokee, OK (United)
 Chickasha, OK (Homeland)
 Cleveland, OK (Cash Saver)
 Clinton, OK (Homeland and United)
 Cordell, OK (United)
 Del City, OK (Cash Saver)
 Duncan, OK (Homeland)
 Edmond, OK (Homeland)
 El Reno, OK (United)
 Elk City, OK (Homeland and United)
 Enid, OK (Cash Saver and United)
 Frederick, OK (United)
 Guthrie, OK (Cash Saver)
 Haskell, OK (Homeland)
 Henryetta, OK (Homeland)
 Hobart, OK (United)
 Hollis, OK (United)
 Jay, OK (Homeland)
 Kingfisher, OK (United)
 Lawton, OK (Cash Saver and Homeland)
 Madill, OK (Cash Saver)
 Mangum, OK (United)
 Marietta, OK (Homeland)
 Muskogee, OK (Homeland and Cash Saver)
 Mustang, OK (Cash Saver)
 Norman, OK (Homeland)
 Nowata, OK (Homeland)
 Okemah, OK (Homeland)
 Oklahoma City, OK (Homeland and Cash Saver)
 Pauls Valley, OK (Homeland)
 Perry, OK (Homeland)
 Ponca City, Ok (Homeland and Ponca City Discount Foods)
 Pryor, OK (Homeland)
 Purcell, OK (Cash Saver)
 Sand Springs, OK (Cash Saver and cox cash saver)
 Seminole, OK (Cash Saver)
 Shawnee, OK (Homeland)
 Stillwater, OK (Homeland)
 Weatherford, OK (United)
 Woodward, OK (United)
 Yukon, OK (Homeland)
 Justin, TX (Homeland)

References
11. Homeland acquiring Stillwater's Food Pyramid among other stores

External links
 Official site

Supermarkets of the United States
Companies based in Oklahoma
Companies that filed for Chapter 11 bankruptcy in 2002
Edmond, Oklahoma